The  is a vertical lift railway bridge across the Chikugo River in Kyūshū, Japan. It was completed in 1935. It links Ōkawa, Fukuoka with Morodomi, Saga, and used to be part of the Saga Railway Line. When that line ceased operation in 1987 the bridge was closed to traffic. In 1996 it was reopened for pedestrians in response to requests from the public.

A precision miniature model of the bridge, which describes its structure, was exhibited at the Exposition Internationale des Arts et Techniques dans la Vie Moderne (1937). Today this model is on display at the Railway Museum (Saitama).

The bridge was designated an Important Cultural Property in 2003, and in 2007 it was included in the Mechanical Engineering Heritage as item No. 23.

References

External links

Railway bridges in Japan
Vertical lift bridges
Tourist attractions in Fukuoka Prefecture
Tourist attractions in Saga Prefecture
Important Cultural Properties of Japan
Bridges completed in 1935
Buildings and structures in Fukuoka Prefecture
Transport in Fukuoka Prefecture
Buildings and structures in Saga Prefecture
Transport in Saga Prefecture